Tug of war was contested as a team event in the Summer Olympics at the Games of every Olympiad from 1900 to 1920. Originally the competition was entered by groups called clubs. A country could enter more than one club in the competition, making it possible for one country to earn multiple medals. This happened in 1904, when the United States won all three medals, and in 1908 when the podium was occupied by three British teams. Sweden was also among the top countries with two medals, one as a member of the mixed team.

During its time as an Olympic sport, it was considered to be part of the Olympic athletics programme, although the sports of tug of war and athletics are now considered distinct.

Medal table
Sources:

Nations
Teams consisted of 6 members, 5 members in 1904, and 8 members in the last three appearances of the sport. In 1900 3 pullers of Denmark and 3 pullers of Sweden competed together in Mixed team that won first place. In 1900 5 pullers of France and 1 puller of Colombia competed together in Mixed team that won second place. In 1904 4 pullers of United States and 1 puller of Germany competed together in Mixed team that won third place.

See also
 List of Olympic venues in discontinued events

References

External links

 
Discontinued sports at the Summer Olympics
Olympics